Thomas Lindsay (11 March 1903 – 1979) was a Scottish footballer who played league football as a winger for Reading, Wigan Borough, Rochdale, Watford, New Brighton and Southport, as well as non-league football for a number of other clubs.

References

Pollok F.C. players
Ardeer Thistle F.C. players
Kilmarnock F.C. players
Alloa Athletic F.C. players
Reading F.C. players
Wigan Borough F.C. players
Rochdale A.F.C. players
Watford F.C. players
New Brighton A.F.C. players
Southport F.C. players
Chester City F.C. players
Prescot Cables F.C. players
Wrexham A.F.C. players
Leyland Motors F.C. players
Scottish footballers
People from Paisley, Renfrewshire
1903 births
1979 deaths
Association footballers not categorized by position